Craigieburn Road is an arterial road located in the northern suburbs of Melbourne.

Major intersections

|}

References

External links 

Roads in Victoria (Australia)
Streets in Melbourne
Transport in the City of Hume
Transport in the City of Whittlesea